Amazonas was a  destroyer of the Brazilian Navy, serving from 1909 to 1931. She was named after the Brazilian state of Amazonas.

Description and Construction

In 1904 Brazil adopted an ambitious plan to renovate and modernize its Navy. The Naval Renovation Program was negotiated and enacted in December 1904 and envisioned acquisition of large number of vessels, including a dozen destroyers. In 1906 the program was modified reducing the total number of destroyers to ten. These ships became known as  destroyers.

Steam for the turbines was provided by two double-ended Yarrow boilers.

The ship mounted two  guns in single mounts. In addition, four 47 mm (3pdr) cannons in single mounts were deployed at the time of launching.

The destroyer was launched on November 21, 1908 at Yarrow's yard in Scotstoun with Senhora Gomes Ferraz, wife of Captain Ferraz, serving as a sponsor. The official full speed trial for Amazonas took place on December 29, 1908 on the Skelmorlie deep-water measured mile at the mouth of the Clyde. During a continuous three hour run with a 100 ton load, the ship exceeded her contract speed of 27 knots.

Amazonas sailed from Glasgow on April 24, 1909, stopped off at Plymouth next day and had to spend six days there waiting for a good weather. From there she proceeded to Lisbon arriving there on May 6 and remained there for 10 days. From Lisbon the destroyer continued on to Las Palmas where she spent 6 more days, and then proceeded to St. Vicente. After staying in Cabo Verde for 4 days, the vessel left St. Vicente and after about 5 days arrived at Recife at approximately 14:00 on June 2, 1909.  The ship departed Recife for Bahia at approximately 16:00 on June 4, 1909 after re-coaling with intention of being put into drydock for repainting, cleaning and inspection.

References

Bibliography 
 Gardiner, Robert and Randal Gray, eds. Conway's All the World's Fighting Ships 1906–1921. Annapolis: Naval Institute Press, 1985. . .
 "CT Amazonas - CT 1." Navios De Guerra Brasileiros. Accessed 27 August 2017.
 "Amazonas." Serviço de Documentação da Marinha — Histórico de Navios. Diretoria do Patrimônio Histórico e Documentação da Marinha, Departamento de História Marítima. Accessed 19 August 2017.

Pará-class destroyers (1908)
1908 ships
Ships built in Glasgow